August Julius Geppert (November 7, 1856 – March 12, 1937) was a German pharmacologist born in Berlin.

He studied medicine at the Universities of Heidelberg and Berlin, earning his doctorate in 1880 with a thesis titled  (The arterial blood gases during fever). From 1880 to 1885 he worked as an assistant at the second medical clinic in Berlin, becoming a lecturer at the University of Bonn during the following year. From 1893 he was an associate professor of pharmacology, attaining the title of "full professor" in 1899 at the University of Giessen.

Geppert is remembered for research involving the physiology of respiration, anesthetics and hygiene.

Written works 
  (On the effects of rarefied air on the organism), with Albert Fraenkel, Berlin 1883.
  (Gas analysis and its physiological application), Ib. 1885.
  (On the regulation of respiration), with Nathan Zuntz, 1888.
  (On the nature of cyanide poisoning, 1889
  (The doctrine of antiseptics), 1889
  (On disinfecting means and methods. 1890
  (On the methodology of gas analysis), 1898.
  (A new anesthesia method), 1899.

Notes

References 
 Pagel: Biographisches Lexikon (biography and written works)

German pharmacologists
Scientists from Berlin
Academic staff of the University of Giessen
1937 deaths
1856 births